The Kosovan film industry produced three feature films in 2014. This article fully lists all non-pornographic films, including short films, that had a release date in that year and which were at least partly made by Kosovo. It does not include films first released in previous years that had release dates in 2014.  Also included is an overview of the major events in Kosovan film, including film festivals and awards ceremonies, as well as lists of those films that have been particularly well received, both critically and financially.

Major releases

Minor releases

See also

 2014 in film
 Cinema of Kosovo
 List of Kosovan submissions for the Academy Award for Best Foreign Language Film
 List of Serbian films of 2014

References

External links

Kosovan
Films

Kosovo